The 2008–09 season was the 108th season in the existence of Stade Rennais F.C. and the club's 15th consecutive season in the top flight of French football. In addition to the domestic league, Angers participated in this season's edition of the Coupe de France and the Coupe de la Ligue. The season covered the period from 1 July 2008 to 30 June 2009.

Transfers

In

Out

Competitions

Overview

Ligue 1

League table

Results summary

Results by round

Matches
The league fixtures were announced on 23 May 2008.

Coupe de France

Coupe de la Ligue

UEFA Cup

Statistics

Goalscorers

References

Stade Rennais F.C. seasons
Rennes